Park Dae-won (born 25 February 1998) is a South Korean football defender who plays for Suwon Samsung Bluewings.

Career Statistics

Club

References

1998 births
Living people
Association football defenders
South Korean footballers
Suwon Samsung Bluewings players
K League 1 players